The 1940 Wisconsin Badgers football team was an American football team that represented the University of Wisconsin in the 1940 Big Ten Conference football season. The team compiled a 4–4 record (3–3 against conference opponents) and finished in a tie for fourth place in the Big Ten Conference. Harry Stuhldreher was in his fifth year as Wisconsin's head coach.

Fullback George Paskvan was selected by the Associated Press (AP) as a second-team player, and by the United Press (UP) as a third-team player, on the 1940 College Football All-America Team. He was also selected by both the AP and UP as a first-team player on the 1940 All-Big Ten Conference football team, and as Wisconsin's most valuable player. John Tennant was the team captain.

The team played its home games at Camp Randall Stadium which was expanded to a capacity of 45,000 for the 1940 season. During the 1940 season, the average attendance at home games was 26,277.

Schedule

References

Wisconsin
Wisconsin Badgers football seasons
Wisconsin Badgers football